Solariella quinni is a species of sea snail, a marine gastropod mollusk, in the family Solariellidae.

Distribution
This species occurs in Pernambuco.

References

Solariellidae